Al-Mazār al-Janūbī is one of the districts  of Karak governorate, Jordan.

References 

Districts of Jordan